Fotbal Club Municipal Ungheni, commonly known as FCM Ungheni,  is a Moldovan football club based in Ungheni, Moldova. They were founded in 2000 and they play in the Moldovan Liga 1, the second division in Moldovan football.

History
The club was found in 2000 by the local authorities as FCM Ungheni and took part in Moldovan "B" Division. In season 2003–04 club was overtaken by local businessman Ghenadie Mitriuc and renamed to FC Spartac. The authorities did not accept this and took the club back and renamed it again, this time to FC Moldova-03. In season 2005–06 team had a debut in Moldovan "A" Division. In 2007 club suffers from financial problems. Local authorities doesn't support it anymore. Thus Ghenadie Mitriuc (at that time vice mayor) again takes club under his control.

Previous names of the club
 2000–2003 – FCM Ungheni
 2003–2004 – FC Spartac Ungheni
 2004–2007 – FC Moldova-03 Ungheni
 2007–2008 – FCM Ungheni
 2008–2011 – FC Olimp Ungheni
 2011-2017 – CS Moldova-03 Ungheni
Since 2017 - FCM Ungheni

League results

External links
CS Moldova-03 Ungheni on Soccerway.com

Moldova-03, CS
Moldova-03, CS
2000 establishments in Moldova